Jahangirabad Raj is a place in Barabanki district in the Indian state of Uttar Pradesh.

Geography

References

Cities and towns in Barabanki district